Lorenzo De Medici Sweat (May 26, 1818 – July 26, 1898) was a U.S. Representative from Maine.

Early life and education
He was born in the town of Parsonsfield in the Massachusetts District of Maine, where he attended Parsonsfield Seminary, a Free Will Baptist school. Sweat attended Bowdoin College, from which he graduated in 1837, and studied law with Rufus McIntire. He attended Harvard Law School, and after graduating in 1840 he was admitted to the bar and practiced law in New Orleans.

Marriage and family
Sweat returned to Maine and settled in Portland, where he continued to practice law. In 1849, he married novelist Margaret Jane Mussey and purchased a home adjoining author and critic, John Neal. The couple did not have children.

Political career
Sweat held various local offices including Portland City Solicitor from 1856 to 1860. He served as a member of the Maine State Senate from 1861 to 1862.

He was elected as a Democrat to the Thirty-eighth Congress and served from March 4, 1863 to March 3, 1865. He voted against the Thirteenth Amendment. He was defeated for reelection in 1864, and was an unsuccessful candidate for election to Congress in 1866.

He later was a delegate to the Union National Convention held in Philadelphia in 1868, and to the 1872 Democratic National Convention. In 1872 he was selected as a member of the Democratic National Committee. He served until 1876 and received credit for helping Samuel J. Tilden receive that year's Democratic nomination for president.

He was an honorary commissioner to the World's Exposition in Paris in 1867 and that in Vienna in 1873.

His house in Portland, the McLellan-Sweat Mansion, was later adapted for use as the Portland Museum of Art, following a bequest by his wife.  Today it is a National Historic Landmark.

His body is interred in Evergreen Cemetery in Portland, Maine.

References

External links 
 

1818 births
1898 deaths
People of Maine in the American Civil War
Bowdoin College alumni
Harvard Law School alumni
People from Parsonsfield, Maine
Burials at Evergreen Cemetery (Portland, Maine)
Democratic Party members of the United States House of Representatives from Maine
Democratic Party Maine state senators
19th-century American politicians